Acronychia octandra, commonly known as doughwood, silver birch or soapwood, is a species of rainforest tree that is endemic to eastern coastal areas of Australia. It has mostly trifoliate leaves with elliptic to egg-shaped leaflets, greenish-white flowers arranged in groups in leaf axils and fleshy fruit of four carpels fused at the base.

Description 

Taxonomy
Doughwood was first formally described in 1860 by Ferdinand von Mueller who gave it the name Euodia octandra and published the description in Fragmenta phytographiae Australiae from specimens collected near the Clarence River by Hermann Beckler. In 1991 Thomas Gordon Hartley changed the name to Acronychia octandra in Australian Systematic Botany. The specific epithet octandra refers to the eight stamens in the flower.

Distribution and habitat

Use in horticulture
Germination from fresh seeds can occur rapidly, as early as 11 days. However, some seeds may germinate five months after sowing.

References

octandra
Trees of Australia
Flora of New South Wales
Flora of Queensland
Plants described in 1860
Taxa named by Ferdinand von Mueller